Music Stand is a Canadian music television series which aired on CBC Television from 1963 to 1964.

Premise
This Winnipeg-produced series featured an orchestra led by Eric Wild. Featured artists included Florence Faiers, Mary Nowell and Jim Pirie.

Scheduling
The first season of this half-hour series was broadcast on Friday nights from 5 July to 20 September 1963 at 9:00 p.m. except for the 8:00 p.m. debut episode. The second season was broadcast Thursdays at 9:30 p.m. from 2 July to 17 September 1964.

See also
 Music of Eric Wild

References

External links
 

CBC Television original programming
1963 Canadian television series debuts
1964 Canadian television series endings